Dominique René François Chevalier (26 June 1956 – 16 August 2012) was a French professional footballer who played as a defender. He most notably made 106 appearances and scored five goals for Valenciennes in the Division 1.

References 

1956 births
2012 deaths
Sportspeople from Puy-de-Dôme
French footballers
Association football defenders
INF Vichy players
Valenciennes FC players
Nîmes Olympique players
Le Puy Foot 43 Auvergne players
ASOA Valence players
French Division 3 (1971–1993) players
Ligue 1 players
Ligue 2 players
Footballers from Auvergne-Rhône-Alpes